The Women's épée event of the 2013 World Fencing Championships will be held on August 8, 2013. The qualification was held on August 5, 2013.

Medalists

Draw

Finals

Top half

Section 1

Section 2

Bottom half

Section 3

Section 4

Final classification

References

 Official site 
 Bracket 
 Final Classification 

2013 World Fencing Championships
World